= Ajdov Kruh =

Slovenian bread

- Type: Flatbread
- Place of origin: Slovenia
- Main ingredients: Buckwheat flour, water, potato

Ajdov Kruh is a type of bread that is consumed mainly in central Slovenia. The ingredients are Buckwheat flour, water, potato, cake yeast, and salt.
